Hot Shot! is the robotics competition event in the 2009-2010 FIRST Tech Challenge. Two teams compete to score points by depositing whiffle balls into designated areas.

Game Overview

Field Description
Hot Shot! is played by four robots on a 12 foot by 12 foot field. Robots are paired together to form red and blue alliances of two teams each. Each alliance starts on a different side of the field, in spots designated by red and blue taped off squares.
There are 3 goal areas, the low goal, the high goal, and the off field goal. The low goal and the high goal are centered on the field. The high goal has a pivot bar that allows it to be spun by a robot contacting the spin bar.  The off field goal is four feet from the field.
There are ball dispensers made out of PVC pipe, full of balls, at each corner of the field. There is a wooden deflector beneath each of the dispensers, angled toward the center of the field that makes the balls roll in different directions. The balls are released from the chutes by a pivoting trigger.

Round Timing
Each round lasts two and a half minutes. The first 30 seconds are composed of an autonomous period, where the robots are controlled completely by a program on the NXT. The next 2 minutes are a "Teleop," or remote controlled period where the robots are controlled remotely through the Bluetooth on the NXT. The last 30 seconds of the teleop period are known as the end game.

Scoring
The off field goal can only be scored in during the end game.
The following points are awarded for normal white balls in each of the corresponding goals:

Yellow curve balls double the score in the goal that they are scored in. They can be released by the team captain during the end game.

References

External links
 Hot Shot Game Information 
 FIRST FTC 2009 Game Manual
 FIRST FTC 2009 One Page Game Overview

2009 in robotics